Caledonia High School is a public, magnet high school located in Caledonia, Michigan. It serves grades 9-12 in the Caledonia Community Schools.

History

The North Campus building opened in 2004. The South Campus building opened in 2017.

Demographics
The demographic breakdown of the 1,543 students enrolled in 2018–19 was:
Male - 51.9%
Female - 48.1%
Native American/Alaskan - 0.1%
Asian - 2.4%
Black - 1.6%
Hispanic - 5.9%
Native Hawaiian/Pacific Islanders - 0.1%
White - 86.1%
Multiracial - 3.8%

16.5% of the students were eligible for free or reduced price lunch.

Athletics
The Caledonia Fighting Scots are members of the Ottawa-Kent Conference. The school colors are purple and gold. The following MHSAA sanctioned sports are offered:

Baseball (boys)
Basketball (girls and boys)
Bowling (girls and boys)
Competitive cheer (girls)
Cross country (girls and boys)
Football (boys)
Golf (girls and boys)
Ice hockey (boys)
Lacrosse (girls and boys)
Skiing (girls and boys)
Soccer (girls and boys)
Softball (girls)
Swim and dive (girls and boys)
Tennis (girls and boys)
Track and field (girls and boys)
Volleyball (girls and boys)
Wrestling (boys)

References

External links

Caledonia Community Schools

Public high schools in Michigan
Schools in Kent County, Michigan